Barracão may refer to:
 Barracão, Rio Grande do Sul, Brazil
 Barracão, Paraná, Brazil
 Alfredo Wagner, Santa Catarina, Brazil, formerly known as Barracão
 Barracão (candomblé), site for public candomblé celebrations